The Indian campaigns of Muhammad of Ghor were a series of invasions by the Ghurid ruler Muhammad of Ghor (c.1173-1206) in the last quarter of the twelfth and early decade of the thirteenth century which lead to the widespread expansion of the Ghurid empire in the Indian subcontinent.

Mu'izz al-Din incursions into India started as early as 1175 and thenceforth continued to lead his armies in the Indian subcontinent until his assassination near the Indus on March 15, 1206. During these invasions, Mu'izz al-Din conquered the Indus Basin from the Ghaznavids and other Ismāʿīlīya rulers and penetrated into the Gangetic doab after defeating a Rajput Confederacy led by Prithviraj Chauhan near Tarain avenging his earlier rout at the same battlefield. While the Ghurid empire was short lived and fell apart in 1215, Mu'izz al-Din's watershed victory in the Second Battle of Tarain established a permanent Muslim presence and influence in the Indian subcontinent.

During his campaigns in India, Mu'izz al-Din extirpated  several local dynasties which included the Qarmatians of Multan, Ghaznavids of Lahore, Chauhans of Ajmer, Tomaras of Delhi, Jadauns of Bayana and possibly the Gahadavalas of Kannauj as well.

Background

During the later half of the twelfth century, the Šansabānī (Ghurids) a Persianate  Tajik dynasty of the eastern Iranian origin which was centred in present-day Afghanistan began their political expansion amidst the collapse of the Ghaznavids who were considerably weakened in their struggle with the Seljuk Empire. In 1163, Ghiyath al-Din Muhammad succeeded as the Ghurid Sultan. In a decade, Ghiyath defeated the Ghuzz Turks and annexed Ghazna and stationed his brother Muhammad of Ghor (c.1173-1206) in Ghazna which was used by him as a base for further inroads into India. Ghiyath al-Din with his centre in Firuzkuh confronted the Khwarazmian Empire for the Ghurid expansion in Central Asia while Mu'izz al-Din, motivated by the exploits of Mahmud of Ghazni began raiding in the Indian Subcontinent from 1175.

The Persian accounts only mentioned a few invasions by the Ghurids prior to their decisive victory of Tarain. Contray to the Persian authorities, the local Hindu and Jain works claimed that the "Mleccha Ghori" (barbarian) was defeated several times before the First Battle of Tarain. While these accounts vastly exaggerate the number of Ghurid invasions in order to magnify the scale of native resistance, though the Ghurids generals after their occupation of Punjab in 1186, possibly began to raid into the territories of north but were fended off by the Rajput chiefs.

Conquest of Multan and Uch
In 1175, Mu'izz al-Din crossed the Indus river through the Gomal Pass instead of the Khyber Pass, as the former was a shorter route to make inroads into the coastal plain of Gujarat and for subsequent advance into the Peninsular India. His first expedition was against the Qarmatians (Shia sect) in Multan. The Qarmatians were crushed by Mahmud of Ghazni in the early eleventh century, although they soon regained their yoke in Multan and even as far as the upper plain of Sindh and possibly Uch as well soon after his death in 1030. They were defeated and Mu'izz al-Din captured Multan after a stiff resistance by the Qaramatians in 1175.

Uch
After capturing Multan, Mu'izz al-Din marched to Uch (situated between Chenab and Jhelum river) which was annexed in 1176.

The exact event of the Ghurid conquest of Uch is contradictory among the contemporary and the later sources. The contemporary author Ibn al-Athir claimed that Uch was under the rule of the Bhati Rajputs. According to his account, when Mu'izz besieged the fort, he made a proposal to the influential Rajput queen of Uch and promised to marry her, If she aids him in his conquest and put her husband to death. Ibn al-Athir further stated that she poisoned her husband and offered to marry her beautiful daughter to the Sultan instead on the condition that after the conquest of the fort, the Sultan will not plunder their royal treasure after the conquest of Uch. Mu'izz al-Din agreed and married her daughter and converted her to Islam. This story is also repeated by the later chroniclers including Ferishta. However, the authenticity of this account is uncertain as the annals of the Bhattis themselves do not mentioned their rule in Uch. The territory of Uch, thus, was possibly  ruled by another sect of the Ismāʿīlīyah monarchs before Mu'izz al-Din's conquest of the region.

The forts of Multan and Uch were placed under Ali Kiramaj and Mu'izz returned to Ghazna. Within a short span, Mu'izz al-Din swiftly moved across the Indus and annexed most of the Sindh and its adjoining areas to facilitate his northward expansion.

Early invasion of Rajasthan

After the conquest of Mulan and Uch, Mu'izz al-Din from the lower Sindh marched into the present-day state of Rajasthan and Gujarat in Anhilwara. The city of Anhilwara was sacked by the Ġhaznāvid ruler Mahmud of Ghaznavid in 1026, who also desecrated the Somnath temple. However, the Solankis regained their influence under Kumarapala. On the eve of Ghurid invasion, Anhilwara was ruled by Mularaja II who marshalled a formidable army of the Rajput veterans which included the Chahamana ruler of Nadol Kelhanadeva, Chahamana ruler of Jalore Kirtipala who was founder of the Jalore line of the Chahamanas and the Parmar ruler Dharavarsha of Abu. The Ghurids were famished in their long march from the arid desert of Rajasthan. In the ensuring battle, the Ghurid troops were thoroughly routed by the Rajput host and Mu'izz al-Din barely managed to escape alive.

The debacle of Kayadhara, made Mu'izz al-Din change his  route who thence turned towards the Ghaznavids of Lahore.

Campaign against Ghaznavids
In 1180 or thereabouts, Mu'izz al-Din marched towards Peshawar and annexed it where the Soomra ruler acknowledged his authority. Afterwards, he turned his attention towards Lahore which was under the possession of Ghaznavid ruler Khusrau Malik who was not capable enough to offer a military resistance considered treaty. He accepted the Ghurid supremacy and further sent his son Malik Shah along with some elephants as hostage for the future conducts.

However, the treaty was for a short while as Mu'izz al-Din again marched upon Lahore in 1184/1185. On the Ghurid advance, Khusrau Malik shut himself inside the city walls. Mu'izz al-Din though, captured Sialkot in 1185. He returned to Ghazni after erecting a fortress in Sialkot. The advancement of Ghurids in Sialkot, lead to a response from Khusrau Malik who besieged the fort in 1185. However, the Ghurid governor of Sialkot managed to defy the Ghaznavid advance. Khusrau Malik, thus, returned to Lahore after a futile effort.

On the report of Ghaznavid advance in Silakot, Mu'izz al-Din advanced from Ghazna with 20,000 cavalry to eradicate the Ghaznavids. As the Ghurids laid siege to Lahore, Khusrau Malik was hard pressed and soon the garrison capitulated. Khusrau Malik was brought out of his castle in accordance with negotiations but was treacherously imprisoned by Mu'izz al-Din and later executed along with all of his family in 1191 or possibly by 1186 itself. Thus, Mu'izz al-Din overthrew the Ghaznavids by 1186.

After the campaigns against the Ghaznavids, Mu'izz al-Din captured the upper Indus plain and most of Punjab to march into the Northern India.

Invasion of the Doab

Mu'izz al-Din marched from Ghazni and captured Bhatinda in 1190 which was under the control of the Chahamana (Chauhan) Rajput clan who emerged as the leading power of northern India in the later twelfth century. The Chahamana ruler of Ajmer, Prithviraj Chauhan (c. 1166-1192), aided by his Rajput allies gathered a vast army of 100,000 lancers and advanced to dislodge the Ghurid garrison in Bhatinda. In a decisive battle fought north of Delhi in Tarain, the outnumbered Ghurid forces were completely routed by the forces of Prithviraj. Mu'izz al-Din was himself wounded in personal combat with Govind Rai of Delhi. However, he was carried away from the battlefield by a Khalji stripling. The Rajputs, however did not chase the Ghurids in their retreat and followed up their victory by laying siege to the fort of Tabarhind (under possession of Mu'izz's general Qazi Ziauddin Tulaki) which was captured after a long siege of thirteen months.

After the disaster of Tarain, Mu'izz al-Din began his preparations to advance once more in the Chahamana kingdom and took an oath that he will not "visit his wife" and "change his clothes" till he avenge his defeat. He raised a vast army of Tajik, Turkic and Afghan troopers and advanced again in 1192 with an army consisting of 120,000 to 130,000 horsemen. The battle was fought at the same place, in which the Ghurids secured a decisive victory after the final assault by their contingent of 10,000 mounted archers under Husain Kharmil which decided the issue.

Govindaraja of Delhi along with the Guhila Samant Singh of Mewar were among the slains. Prithviraj was captured and summarily executed. The Ghurids penetrated into the core kingdom of the Chahamanas and annexed whole of their Sapādalakṣa territory including Ajmer. However, the Ghurids, as corroborated by the numismatic evidences, reinstated Prithviraja's minor son Govindaraja IV as their de facto ruler on the condition of tributary. The Ghurids followed their victory by sacking Ajmer in the course of which they massacred several civilians, took many as slaves and destroyed several Hindu temples of Ajmer.

The decisive battle of Tarain is regarded as a landmark event in the Medieval India, which led to the destruction of Rajput powers for a while and laid the foundation of the Muslim rule in the Indian Subcontinent.

Further campaigns

Mu'izz al-Din after his triumpth in Tarain, limited his presence in India  to centralize himself in the Ghurid expansion in Transoxiana.

In 1194, Mu'izz al-Din returned to India and crossed the Jamuna with an army of 50,000 troopers to confront the Gahadavala king Jayachandra who held his sway over extensive territories in the present-day Uttar Pradesh and Bihar. In a decisive battle fought near the modern day Chandawar, the Gahadavalas managed to kept the Ghurid forces at bay until a chance arrow killed Jayachandra and his armies were routed. The Ghurids pillaged the holy city of Kāshí after capturing Kannauj and destroyed many Hindu temples there.

Afterwards, Mu'izz al-Din marched towards India again in 1196 and captured the territory of Bayana from the Jadaun Rajputs after a brief siege to guard the southern flank of Delhi. The newly conquered territory was placed under his senior slave Bahauddin Turghil who further laid siege to the Gwalior fort and annexed it after subjugating the Parihar ruler.

Mu'izz al-Din's slave commanders continued the expansion of the Ghurid empire and raided the Rajput strongholds in the Doab, Rajasthan, Malwa and uptil Kalinjar in the Ganga Valley. In the decade of the 1200s, another lieutenant of Mu'izz al-Din Muhammad Bakhtiyar Khalji expanded the Ghurid influence in west of the Ganges Basin in states of Bihar and Bengal. He defeated the Sena king of Bengal Lakshmana Sena and expanded as far as Lakhnauti in Bengal.

Final Campaign

In March 1203, his brother died in Herath due to illness and Mu'izz al-Din succeeded him as the sole ruler of the Ghurid dynasty. In 1204, Mu'izz al-Din suffered a sharp reverse near the river Oxus against the combined forces of Qara Khitai (Western Lio) and the Kara-Khanid Khanate contingent led by Tayangu (as aid of Alauddin Shah) which lead to the loss of most of the Khurasan (except Herath and Balkh) and initiated a number of rebellions in his empire.

The Hindu Khokhars rebelled by cutting Mu'izz al-Din's supply line between Lahore and Ghazna. According to the 16th-17th century chronicler Firishta, the Khokhars were a "disgraced race" who considered "slaying of Muslims as the path to paradise". Mu'izz al-Din dispatched a force under his slave Illtutmish to suppress the revolt, although Mu'izz al-Din later himself marched for his last campaign into India in late 1205. In the ensuring battle, the Khokhars were routed after Qutb ud-Din Aibak or Illtutmish arrived with a contingent from Lahore. After the battle, Mu'izz al-Din ordered a general massacre of the Khokhars and further enslaved many of them.

On his way back to Ghazna, Mu'izz al-Din was assassinated near the Indus in Dhamyak by the Ismāʿīlīyah Muslims on 15 March 1206. After his death, his empire collapsed as his successors were forced to acknowledge the suzerenity of Alauddin Shah of Khwarazm who overthrew them by 1215. However, his slave generals after a brief struggle sustained his conquests in north India and established the Delhi Sultanate in 1206.

Footnotes

Citations

Bibliography

 
 
 
 
 
 
 
 
 
 
 
 
 
 

Islamic rule in the Indian subcontinent
Ghurid dynasty
Military history of India
12th-century military history
History of South Asia
12th century in India
Battles involving the Indian kingdoms
Battles involving Turkic peoples
13th century in India
Battles involving the Rajputs
Battles involving the Qarmatians
Medieval conflicts
12th-century conflicts
History of Pakistan
History of Islam in India